is a Japanese publisher named for Shōnen Gaho ("Boy's Illustrated News Magazine"), one of its first magazines. Founded in 1945, it previously published driving manuals and English conversation guides. Now it is known for magazines such as biweekly seinen manga Young King, the monthly manga serials Young King OURs and Monthly Young King. Its longtime flagship manga weekly for boys,  (1963–1988), is now defunct. Its current president is Isao Imai.

External links
 

 
Book publishing companies in Tokyo
Publishing companies established in 1945
Comic book publishing companies in Tokyo
Magazine publishing companies in Tokyo
Japanese companies established in 1945